Padamyar FM (Burmese: ပတ္တမြားအက်ဖ်အမ်) is one of the popular FM station in Myanmar. The station is serving around Myanmar area to provide the audience the best music library, entertainment and edutainment programs for every lifestyle. With over 14 million listeners on air, Padamyar FM covers every genre from 5 AM to 11 PM daily.

Since 2009 August, they were in test transmission at Sagaing region with 88.9 MHz. Now they have installed FM transmitters at following cities.

Services

References

External links

Broadcast coverage map

Radio stations in Myanmar
2009 establishments in Myanmar